Troublesome Night 11 is a 2001 Hong Kong horror comedy film produced by Nam Yin and directed by Yeung Wan-king. It is the 11th of the 20 films in the Troublesome Night film series.

Plot
A hustler tricks a restaurateur into lending him HK$2 million, drugs her, brings her to a deserted beach and kills her. A group of friends doing voluntary work at the beach discover the corpse and call the police, but the body had disappeared when they come back. The vengeful spirit of the restaurateur possesses the other girls and returns to take her revenge on the hustler.

Cast
 Law Lan as Mrs Bud Lung
 Halina Tam as Moon
 David Lee as Tom
 Tong Ka-fai as Bud Gay
 Ronnie Cheung as Bud Yan
 Teresa Mak as Lau Sau-wan
 Bessie Chan as Eva Chan
 Vivian Lok as Jenny
 Onitsuka as Lai Chor-pat
 Mr Nine as Lai Chor-kau
 Jameson Lam as Tom's master
 Jeff Kam as Jeffrey

External links
 
 

2001 comedy horror films
2001 films
Hong Kong comedy horror films
2000s Cantonese-language films
Troublesome Night (film series)
2000s Hong Kong films